Samuel Patrick Kemp (29 August 1932 – 1987) was an English professional footballer who played as a winger for Sunderland.

References

1932 births
1987 deaths
Footballers from Stockton-on-Tees
English footballers
Association football wingers
Whitby Town F.C. players
Sunderland A.F.C. players
Sheffield United F.C. players
Mansfield Town F.C. players
Gateshead F.C. players
English Football League players